A Taste of Tequila is an album by jazz trumpeter Chet Baker and the Mariachi Brass recorded in 1965 and released on the World Pacific label.

Reception

Scott Yanow of Allmusic states, "During 1965-1966, he cut six remarkably commercial throwaways for the once viable World Pacific label. A Taste of Tequila was the first, featuring Baker's unenthusiastic solos on ten poppish tunes while joined by the Mariachi Brass, a rather weak derivative of the Tijuana Brass".

Track listing
 "Flowers on the Wall" (Lew DeWitt) - 2:19
 "Tequila" (Chuck Rio) - 2:06   
 "Mexico" (Boudleaux Bryant) - 2:14   
 "Cuando Calienta el Sol" (Rafael Gaston Perez) - 2:44
 "Hot Toddy" (Ralph Flanagan, Herb Hendler) - 2:12   
 "Twenty Four Hours from Tulsa" (Burt Bacharach, Hal David) - 3:10   
 "Speedy Gonzales" (Buddy Kaye, Ethel Lee, David Hess) - 2:36   
 "Come a Little Bit Closer" (Tommy Boyce, Bobby Hart, Wes Farrell) - 2:52   
 "El Paso" (Marty Robbins) - 3:10   
 "La Bamba" (Traditional) - 2:15

Personnel
Chet Baker - flugelhorn
Tony Terran - trumpet
The Mariachi Brass
Jack Nitzsche - arranger, conductor

References 

1966 albums
Chet Baker albums
Pacific Jazz Records albums
Albums arranged by Jack Nitzsche